The Green EP is an extended play released by English rapper Professor Green on his own record label, Green Machine. The EP was released on November 5, 2008, long before his mainstream breakthrough with Alive Till I'm Dead. The EP features guest vocals from the likes of Nyomi Gray, Adele and Ed Hayes. The EP was produced after Green's first record label, The Beats, went into administration. "Don't Let Go", featuring NY, was the first and only single to be released from the EP. The song was produced by Taz Buckfaster, a DJ from Glasgow, Scotland. Notably, singer Adele is featured on the track "Hometown", a remix of her 2007 song "Hometown Glory".

Track listing

References

2008 debut EPs
Professor Green albums